The International Journal of Children's Rights is an academic journal relating to children's rights. It was established in 1993 and the editor-in-chief is Laura Lundy.

References

Law journals
Children's rights
Brill Publishers academic journals
Publications established in 1993
Quarterly journals